The Tough is a 1957 Egyptian film directed by Salah Abouseif. It was entered into the 7th Berlin International Film Festival.

Cast
 Farid Shawqi
 Taheya Cariocca
 Zaki Rostom
 Tewfik El-Dekn
 Mimi Shakeeb
 Fakher Fakher
 Mahmoud El-Sabbaa
 Hassan el Baroudi
 Mohamed Reda
 Abdel Alim Khattab
 Hoda Soltan
 Mahmoud El-Meliguy

References

External links

1957 films
1950s Arabic-language films
Egyptian black-and-white films
Films directed by Salah Abu Seif